The 1/4 inch Akai is a portable helical scan EIA and CCIR analog recording video tape recorder (VTR) with two video record heads on the scanning drum. The units were available with an optional RF modulator to play back through a TV set, as well as a detachable video monitor. The Akai Electric Ltd. VTR plant was in Tokyo, Japan.

Black-and-white models 

Akai model VTS-100 was introduced in 1967 and was a B&W portable VTR with a one tube camera.

The next models, VTS-110 and VTS-120, had similar specifications:

 S/N > 40 dB
 Playback: about 200-lines of image resolution
 Capstan Tape speed (EIA) 11.25 inches per second (20 minute reel) / (CCIR) 23.85 cm/s (24 minute reel)
 VTR Weight: 11 lb.
 Monitor Weight: 3.5 lb.

The Akai X500-VT is perhaps the oddest of the Akai format machines in as much as it is both a stereo reel to reel audio recorder of 3.3/4 and 7.5 inch per sec tape speed having an auto reverse function, as well as a video recorder combined in the same machine. Two separate tape paths are used and according to the way the tape is threaded, either two channel stereo audio 4-track, or black and white video with monoaural sound could be recorded and played. Tape speed for video recording like the VT100 and VT110 is 11.1/4 Inch per sec.

For the time, this machine was very advanced using many innovations not used in other domestic video machines for many years, such as inverter drive video head motor to name but one. About 10 years later when Sony introduced the Beta format, the first couple of models the video head speed was controlled by a line synchronised AC motor and eddy-current brake.

The X500VT was sold only in Japan and the United States (under the Rheem/Roberts re-badge agreement) and in very low quantities due to its high cost. the highest serial number known to author is 00050, indicating the probability of only a tiny production run.

Camera specs:

 One 2/3" Vidicon video camera

Akai produced two types of portable black and white VTR using 1/4 inch tape: Portables using an open reel of 13 cm diameter (VT-100/-110/-120), and a single stationary model using a 27 cm open reel, designated VT-700.

Color model 

Akai model VTS-150 was introduced in 1974. It recorded composite video on 1/4 inch reel-to-reel videotape and could record and play back B&W or color. It came with a hand-held two-tube camera with a zoom lens.  The system was very small and lightweight for its time. The VTR with the video camera weighed only 22 pounds. A single cable was used to connect the ENG camera to the VTR for power, video and the microphone audio. This model was available in NTSC, PAL and SECAM television formats.

VTR specs:

 S/N > 40 dB
 Playback: about 230-lines of image resolution
 Capstan Tape speed (EIA NTSC): 254.27 mm/s (10 inches per second); (CCIR PAL or SECAM): 217.97 mm/s
 Recording time: 26 minutes (NTSC) or 30 minutes (PAL or SECAM) on a five-inch reel
 One audio track
 One control track
 Weight: 16.4 lb.
 Power consumption: 32 Watts
 Battery capacity: about 40 minutes
 Size 10.5" x 14.2" x 5.6"

Camera specs (NTSC, PAL and SECAM):

 S/N > 40 dB
 One 2/3" Vidicon
 One chroma Tube, an Akai dissector tube
 1.5" VF - viewfinder
 Lens: 6x - (1.5 to 75 mm)
 300 lines of resolution
 To use without the VTR, CCU-150 powered the camera with 12 VDC
 CCU-150 had RF output and Genlock sync input
 Weight: 5.76 lb.
 Size 3.5" x 9.3" x 13.2"
 Microphone audio impedance: 600 ohms

See also 

 Akai VK

References

External links 

 VTS-100 in PDF
 LabGuy's World, with scans of media for multiple Akai devices
 mardersteig.mynetcologne.de 1972: Akai Portable VTR and Camera

Videotape
Film and video technology
Audiovisual introductions in 1967